Amphissa acutecostata is a species of sea snail, a marine gastropod mollusc in the family Columbellidae, the dove snails.

Description

Distribution

References

 Gofas, S.; Le Renard, J.; Bouchet, P. (2001). Mollusca, in: Costello, M.J. et al. (Ed.) (2001). European register of marine species: a check-list of the marine species in Europe and a bibliography of guides to their identification. Collection Patrimoines Naturels, 50: pp. 180–213
 Bouchet P. & Warén A. (1985). Revision of the Northeast Atlantic bathyal and abyssal Neogastropoda excluding Turridae (Mollusca, Gastropoda). Bollettino Malacologico Suppl. 1: 121–296

External links
  Serge GOFAS, Ángel A. LUQUE, Joan Daniel OLIVER,José TEMPLADO & Alberto SERRA (2021) - The Mollusca of Galicia Bank (NE Atlantic Ocean); European Journal of Taxonomy 785: 1–114

Columbellidae
Gastropods described in 1844